Eugène Letendre (10 August 1931 – 24 April 2014) was a French professional racing cyclist. He rode two editions of the Tour de France.

References

External links
 

1931 births
2014 deaths
French male cyclists
Sportspeople from Ille-et-Vilaine
Cyclists from Brittany